Hinnigan is a surname. Notable people with the surname include:

Joe Hinnigan (born 1955), English footballer, physiotherapist, and coach
Michelle Hinnigan (born 1990), English women's footballer
Tony Hinnigan, Scottish musician

See also
Hannigan